Jalase Landscape Conservation Area is a nature park situated in Rapla County, Estonia.

Its area is 2720 ha.

The protected area was designated in 1937 to protect Lipstu Heath. In 1964, also Jalase Lake was taken under protection. In 2003, the protected area was redesigned to the landscape conservation area.

References

Nature reserves in Estonia
Geography of Rapla County